A total lunar eclipse took place on Saturday, May 24 and Sunday, May 25, 1975, the first of two total lunar eclipses in 1975. The Moon was plunged into darkness for 1 hour and 28 minutes in a deep total eclipse which saw the Moon 43% of its diameter inside the Earth's umbral shadow. The visual effect of an eclipse depends on the state of the Earth's atmosphere, but the Moon may have been stained a deep red colour. The partial eclipse lasted for 3 hours and 35 minutes in total. Occurring only 4.4 days after perigee (Perigee on May 20, 1975), the Moon's apparent diameter was 0.7% larger than average. The moon was 377,010 km (234,263 mi) from the Earth at greatest eclipse.

The eclipse was a dark one with the southern tip of the moon passing through the center of the Earth's shadow. This was the first central eclipse of Saros series 130.

Visibility 
It was completely visible over North and South America, seen rising over Australia on the evening of Sunday 25 May 1975, and setting over Africa, and Western Europe on the morning of Sunday 25 May 1975.

Related lunar eclipses

Eclipses in 1975 
 A partial solar eclipse on Sunday, 11 May 1975.
 A total lunar eclipse on Sunday, 25 May 1975.
 A partial solar eclipse on Monday, 3 November 1975.
 A total lunar eclipse on Tuesday, 18 November 1975.

Lunar year series

Saros series

Half-Saros cycle
A lunar eclipse will be preceded and followed by solar eclipses by 9 years and 5.5 days (a half saros). This lunar eclipse is related to two annular solar eclipses of Solar Saros 137.

See also 
Lists of lunar eclipses
List of 20th-century lunar eclipses

References

External links 
 
 The Total Lunar Eclipse of May 24-25, 1975, Feinstein, A., Forte, J. C., & Cabrera, A.

1975-05
1975-05
1975 in science
May 1975 events